Pablo Machín Díez (born 7 April 1975) is a Spanish football manager and former player who played as a right back.

Playing career
Born in Soria, Machín was a CD Numancia youth graduate. Despite making five first team appearances during the 1993–94 season in Segunda División B, his spell at the club was mainly associated with the reserves until 1998, when a severe knee injury forced his retirement at the age of just 23.

Coaching career 
In 2000 he returned to Numancia, being assigned to its youth setup, and was promoted to the B-side in Tercera División in 2006; after leading the club to the play-offs, he was appointed the main squad's assistant in the 2007 summer.

On 30 May 2011, Machín was appointed first-team coach in Segunda División, replacing fired Juan Carlos Unzué. After keeping them in the league for the following two seasons, he left the Rojillos.
On

Machín replaced fired Javi López at the helm of Girona FC on 9 March 2014. After an impressive 2014–15 campaign, which his side finished third but failed to gain promotion, he signed a two-year contract extension until 2018.

On 17 August 2017, after achieving promotion to La Liga, Machín extended his contract until 2019. He led the club to an impressive tenth position, only seven points shy of a European competition spot; highlights included a 6–0 home routing of UD Las Palmas.

Machín was appointed Sevilla FC coach on 28 May 2018, signing a two-year contract with the club. The following 15 March, he was sacked after being knocked out of the UEFA Europa League round of 16 by SK Slavia Praha the previous day.

On 7 October 2019, Machín was appointed manager of RCD Espanyol in the top tier for two years, replacing fired David Gallego. He himself was sacked on 22 December, with the team in last place.

On 22 July 2020, Machín was appointed manager of Chinese Super League side Qingdao Huanghai FC, but left the club eight days after his appointment, for personal reasons. On 5 August, he replaced Juan Muñiz at the helm of Deportivo Alavés in the top tier, but was himself dismissed on 12 January 2021.

On 31 January 2021, Machín was named new manager of Saudi club Al-Ain FC. He moved five months later to Al-Raed FC, in the same country. On 26 January 2022, Machín was sacked by Al-Raed. They sat at 8th at the time of the sacking, eight points clear of the relegation zone.

On 17 November 2022, Machín replaced Jorge Almirón at the helm of Elche CF, becoming their third manager of the season. He was himself dismissed the following 20 March, with the club in the last position.

Managerial statistics

References

External links

1975 births
Living people
People from Soria
Sportspeople from the Province of Soria
Spanish footballers
Footballers from Castile and León
Association football defenders
Segunda División B players
CD Numancia players
Spanish football managers
La Liga managers
Segunda División managers
CD Numancia managers
Girona FC managers
Sevilla FC managers
RCD Espanyol managers
Deportivo Alavés managers
Elche CF managers
Saudi Professional League managers
Expatriate football managers in Saudi Arabia
Spanish expatriate sportspeople in Saudi Arabia
Al-Ain FC (Saudi Arabia) managers
Al-Raed FC managers